Oliver Naesen (born 16 September 1990) is a Belgian professional racing cyclist, who currently rides for UCI WorldTeam . Considered a specialist of the one-day classics, he won the 2017 Belgian National Road Race Championships, as well as the Bretagne Classic in 2016 and 2018. He is the brother of fellow racing cyclist Lawrence Naesen.

Career

2014–2016
Naesen turned professional in August 2014 as a stagiaire with the  team, before joining  in 2015 and Swiss UCI WorldTeam  in 2016. 

He made his Grand Tour debut at the 2016 Tour de France, in which he was awarded the combativity award on the fourth stage. He made a spectacular crash in the last corner of the stage 18 mountain time trial, but finished his maiden Tour in 83rd position overall.

Weeks after the Tour de France, he won the Bretagne Classic; his first victory in a UCI World Tour race. In September, he finished second in the general classification of the 2016 Eneco Tour after a strong performance in the final stage to Geraardsbergen. His results earned him a selection for the World Championship road race in Qatar, in which he finished 23rd.

AG2R La Mondiale (2017–present)
Following the discontinuation of the IAM Cycling team, Naesen signed a two-year contract with French team . In the spring of 2017, he confirmed his status as a classics talent with top-10 finishes in the Omloop Het Nieuwsblad, Kuurne–Brussels–Kuurne, E3 Harelbeke and Gent–Wevelgem. In the Tour of Flanders, he was in a three-man chase group behind Philippe Gilbert, when Peter Sagan, leading the group, crashed on Oude Kwaremont and brought down Naesen and Greg Van Avermaet. Naesen and Sagan broke their bike frames, preventing them from defending their podium positions, and Naesen ultimately finished 23rd. In Summer, he won the 2017 Belgian National Road Race Championships in Antwerp, before competing in his second Tour de France.

In 2018, he finished 11th at the Tour of Flanders and 12th in Paris–Roubaix. In August, he won the Bretagne Classic Ouest–France for the second time in three years.

Major results

2013
 10th Grote Prijs Stad Geel
2014
 3rd Memorial Van Coningsloo
 4th Ronde van Limburg
 6th Binche–Chimay–Binche
 6th Omloop Het Nieuwsblad U23
 8th Gooikse Pijl
 9th Handzame Classic
 10th Druivenkoers Overijse
 10th Internationale Wielertrofee Jong Maar Moedig
 10th Flèche Ardennaise
2015
 1st Polynormande
 1st Gooikse Pijl
 2nd Schaal Sels
 3rd Grote Prijs Stad Zottegem
 3rd Omloop van het Waasland
 5th Druivenkoers Overijse
 6th Overall Tour de Luxembourg
1st  Young rider classification
 7th Overall Tour of Belgium
 10th Le Samyn
 10th Tour de Vendée
2016
 1st Bretagne Classic
 1st GP Lucien Van Impe
 2nd Overall Eneco Tour
 2nd Tour de l'Eurométropole
 10th Binche–Chimay–Binche
  Combativity award Stage 4 Tour de France
2017
 1st  Road race, National Road Championships
 3rd Overall Four Days of Dunkirk
 3rd E3 Harelbeke
 5th Overall BinckBank Tour
 6th Paris–Tours
 6th Dwars door Vlaanderen
 6th Tour de l'Eurométropole
 7th Omloop Het Nieuwsblad
 8th Overall Tour of Belgium
 8th Kuurne–Brussels–Kuurne
 10th London–Surrey Classic
 10th Binche–Chimay–Binche
2018
 1st Bretagne Classic
 3rd Eschborn–Frankfurt
 3rd Binche–Chimay–Binche
 3rd Tour de l'Eurométropole
 4th E3 Harelbeke
 4th Grand Prix Cycliste de Montréal
 4th Paris–Tours
 6th Gent–Wevelgem
 9th Grand Prix d'Isbergues
2019
 2nd Overall BinckBank Tour
1st Stage 7
 2nd Milan–San Remo
 2nd Binche–Chimay–Binche
 3rd Gent–Wevelgem
 3rd Paris–Tours
 7th Tour of Flanders
 8th E3 Binckbank Classic
 8th London–Surrey Classic
 10th Omloop Het Nieuwsblad
 10th EuroEyes Cyclassics
2020
 7th Tour of Flanders
 7th Omloop Het Nieuwsblad
 10th Overall Tour de Wallonie
2021
 4th E3 Saxo Bank Classic
 7th Tro-Bro Léon
2022
 2nd Overall Four Days of Dunkirk
 4th Omloop Het Nieuwsblad
 7th Bretagne Classic
 8th Primus Classic

Grand Tour general classification results timeline

Classics results timeline

Major championships timeline

References

External links

 
 
 
 
 

1990 births
Living people
Belgian male cyclists
Sportspeople from Ostend
Cyclists from West Flanders